Pycnoplectus is a genus of  in the family Staphylinidae. There are about 11 described species in Pycnoplectus.

Species
These 11 species belong to the genus Pycnoplectus:
 Pycnoplectus cediosus Wagner, 1975
 Pycnoplectus congener (Casey, 1884)
 Pycnoplectus difficilis (LeConte, 1849)
 Pycnoplectus falcatus Wagner, 1975
 Pycnoplectus infossus (Raffray, 1904)
 Pycnoplectus interruptus (LeConte, 1849)
 Pycnoplectus linearis (LeConte, 1849)
 Pycnoplectus longipennis Casey, 1908
 Pycnoplectus parki Wagner, 1975
 Pycnoplectus sexualis (Casey, 1884)
 Pycnoplectus spinifer (Casey, 1884)

References

Further reading

 
 

Pselaphinae
Articles created by Qbugbot